Edward O'Grady is an champion Irish National Hunt racehorse trainer. Throughout the 1980s and 1990s, O'Grady was the leading Irish trainer at Cheltenham (after Vincent O'Brien) by number of winners. He was played by Pierce Brosnan in the 1980 film Murphy's Stroke.

Early life
O'Grady attended Blackrock College and left veterinary college in Dublin to take over at Killeen Stables following his father's death in 1973. His father, Willie, was a top jump jockey and twice Irish Champion Jockey in 1934 and 1935. O'Grady had his first winner when Timmy Hyde saddled Vibrax in a Handicap Hurdle in Gowran Park. Following this success a virus struck all of his 18 horses causing many owners to leave him. In 1974 O’Grady had his first Cheltenham Festival winner when Mouse Morris rode Mr. Midland to victory.

1970s and 80s
In 1974 Gay Future, a horse trained by O'Grady, was involved in an attempted coup by an Irish betting syndicate in 1974. O'Grady was one of four people arrested during the police investigation but the charges against him were dropped. In 2020, the Irish Times described it as "one of racing’s most daring scams was almost pulled off." It was depicted in the 1980 film Murphy's Stroke, with Pierce Brosnan playing O'Grady.

O'Grady soon became established as the leading national hunt trainer in Ireland, and Golden Cygnet became the stable star. O'Grady named Golden Cygnet as the most naturally talented horse he had trained. Golden Cygnet won the Supreme Novice Hurdle in Cheltenham in 1978. The following month he died after a fall in the Scottish Champion Hurdle at Ayr. Further tragedy struck the stable when the J.P. McManus owned Shining Flame broke a leg at Tramore Racecourse less than two weeks after capturing the Galway Plate. Nevertheless, O'Grady went on to become leading trainer in 1979.

Following Shining Flame's victory in 1978 O'Grady went on to win three Galway Plates in four years, with Hind Hope and Rugged Lucy winning in 1979 and 1981 respectively. Hard Tarquin's victory in the 1979 Galway Hurdle made him only the fifth trainer to win both "big races" in the same year.

Drumlargan won the 1983 Whitbread Gold Cup, which O'Grady described as "the most memorable win of my career". In the same year Bit of a Skite proved victorious in the Irish Grand National.

1990s and 2000s
Sound Man won two successive Tingle Creek Chases (1995 and 1996), and Blitzkrieg captured the Victor Chandler Chase in 1991. Sacundai, with Ruby Walsh aboard, captured the Martell Cognac Aintree Hurdle in 2003. In the same year, Back in Front won the Supreme Novices' Hurdle at Cheltenham and the Evening Herald Novice Hurdle at Punchestown. More recent success came in 2009 when Tranquil Sea ridden by Andrew McNamara became the first Irish-trained horse since Bright Highway in 1980 to win the Paddy Power Gold Cup at Cheltenham.

Family
O'Grady married in 1999. His wife Maria was killed in a fall while out hunting with the Tipperary Foxhounds in November 2017.

References 

Irish racehorse trainers
Sportspeople from County Tipperary
1949 births
Living people